The Northboro Park Historic District is a U.S. historic district (designated as such on February 20, 2007) located in West Palm Beach, Florida. The district is bounded by 40th N, Flagler Drive, 36th Street and Broadway.

References

National Register of Historic Places in Palm Beach County, Florida
Historic districts on the National Register of Historic Places in Florida
Historic districts in Palm Beach County, Florida
West Palm Beach, Florida